Perkins High School may refer to:

Perkins High School (Sandusky, Ohio), Perkins Township, Ohio
Perkins-Tryon High School, Perkins, Oklahoma
Guy–Perkins High School, Guy, Arkansas